is the twenty-third single by the Japanese artist, Masaharu Fukuyama. It was released on 22 October 2008.

Track listing

Limited Edition CD
Sō (New Love New World)

Higher Stage
Sō (New Love New World) (original karaoke)
 (original karaoke)
Higher Stage (original karaoke)

Normal Edition CD
Sō (New Love New World)

Higher Stage
Sō (New Love New World) (original karaoke)
 (original karaoke)
Higher Stage (original karaoke)

Limited Edition DVD A
Sō (New Love New World) (music clip)

Limited Edition Bonus CD B
Kakusei Mo Mento
vs. Chikaku To Kairaku No Rasen

Oricon sales chart (Japan)

References

2008 singles
Masaharu Fukuyama songs
Songs written by Masaharu Fukuyama
2008 songs